Laurent Pelly (born 14 January 1962 in Paris) is a French opera and theatre director.  He enjoys a career as one of France's most sought after directors of both theatre and opera, working regularly in the world's most prestigious houses.

Biography
In 1980 (at the age of 18) he founded the Compagnie Théâtrale du Pélican which, from 1982, he co-directed with Agathe Mélinand.  
In 1994, he became an artist in association with Le Centre Dramatique National des Alpes (CDNA), Grenoble being appointed director from 1997 to 2007.
From 2008–2018 he was co-director, with Agathe Mélinand, of Théâtre national de Toulouse Midi-Pyrénées (TNT).
Laurent Pelly is particularly renowned for his work in French repertoire, and has a skill for revealing the serious side of comedy.  
He underlines his interpretation of characters through skilful and inspired costume designs and in recent years has expanded into set design.  
Many of Laurent Pelly's productions have been filmed for DVD and broadcast on world wide television.

Theatre productions
1977 : L'Ombre d'Evguéni Schwartz, Théâtre Daniel Sorano Vincennes

Le Pélican
1980 : Si jamais je te pince !... by Eugène Labiche, Théâtre Daniel Sorano Vincennes
1982 : Le Dîner bourgeois by Henry Monnier, Théâtre Daniel Sorano Vincennes, and Théâtre de la Plaine, 1983
1984 : Chambres calmes vue sur la mer by Michel Jourdheuil, Théâtre de la Plaine
En cas de pluie by Philippe Beglia
Quel amour d'enfant ! by Comtesse de Ségur
Comment ça va ? Au secours ! by Vladimir Maïakovski
Comment j'ai écrit certains de mes livres by Raymond Roussel
1985 : Monsieur Hugo by Victor Hugo, staging with Jean-Louis Martin-Barbaz, Centre dramatique national de Béthune
1985 : Quatrevingt-treize by Victor Hugo, staging with Jean-Louis Martin-Barbaz, Centre dramatique national de Béthune
1986 : Chat en poche by Georges Feydeau, Centre dramatique national de Béthune, and Théâtre Firmin Gémier Antony, 1987
1986 : Barouf à Chioggia by Carlo Goldoni, staging with Jean-Louis Martin-  Barbaz, Centre dramatique national, Nord-Pas-de-Calais, and Théâtre de la Cité internationale, 1987
1988 : Lola Montès by Jacques Téphany, staging with Jean-Louis Martin-Barbaz, Centre dramatique national de Béthune
1989 : Madame Angot by Maillot, Théâtre national de Chaillot
Eva Perón by Copi, Théâtre national de Chaillot
Un cœur sous une soutane-Tentative de commémoration production based upon Arthur Rimbaud, Théâtre national de Chaillot
1994 : Talking Heads by Alan Bennett, Théâtre Paris-Villette
1994 : La Famille Fenouillard by Christophe
1996 : En caravane by Elizabeth von Arnim, Théâtre Paris-Villette

Centre Dramatique National des Alpes
1995 : L'Heureux Stratagème by Marivaux
1997 : Souingue!
1998 : Et Vian! En avant la zique!
Loretta Strong by Copi
La Baye by Philippe Adrien
La Danse de mort by August Strindberg
2001 : C'est pas la vie ? by Laurent Pelly and Agathe Mélinand, Théâtre de Sartrouville
2002 : Le Voyage de monsieur Perrichon by Eugène Labiche
2002 : J'en ai marre de l'amour
2003 : Vendre by Laurent Pelly and Agathe Mélinand
2003 : Les Chaises by Eugène Ionesco, Théâtre de la Criée
2004 : Le Roi nu by Evguéni Schwartz
2005 : Foi, amour, espérance by Ödön von Horváth
2005 : I cosmonauti russi
2006 : Le Songe byAugust Strindberg
2006 : Les Aventures d'Alice au pays des merveilles by Lewis Carroll
2006 : Une visite inopportune by Copi, Théâtre de l'Ouest parisien
2006 : Les Malices de Plick et Plock by Christophe, Théâtre de Sartrouville

TNT-Théâtre national de Toulouse Midi-Pyrénées
2008 : Le Roi nu byEvguéni Schwartz
2008 : Les Aventures d'Alice au pays des merveilles by Lewis Carroll
2008 : Jacques ou la soumission and L'avenir est dans les œufs by Eugène Ionesco, Théâtre de l'Athénée-Louis-Jouvet
2008 : Le Menteur by Carlo Goldoni
2009 : Renseignements généraux by Serge Valletti
2009 : Talking Heads by Alan Bennett, Théâtre du Rond-Point, Théâtre Marigny
2009 : Cami la vie drôle ! by Pierre Henri Cami
2009 : Natalie Dessay, songs by Michel Legrand
2010 : Le Roi nu by Evguéni Schwartz, Théâtre de la Tempête
2010 : Mille francs de récompense by Victor Hugo (winner of the 2011 French Critics "Best Director" award, as well as "Best set design")
2010 : Funérailles d'hiver by Hanoch Levin
2011 : Les Aventures de Sindbad le Marin by Agathe Mélinand
2011 : J'ai examiné une ampoule électrique et j'en ai été satisfait, script by Daniil Harms
2012 : Macbeth by William Shakespeare
2013 : Mangeront-ils ? by Victor Hugo
2014 : Songe d'une nuit d'été de William Shakespeare

Odéon-Théâtre de l'Europe
1995 : Peines d'amour perdues by William Shakespeare
2011: Mille francs de récompense by Victor Hugo (winner of the 2011 French critics "best director" award, as well as "best set design")

Festival d'Avignon
1997 : Des Héros et des dieux from Hymnes homériques
1998 : Vie et mort du roi Jean by William Shakespeare

Comédie-Française
2011 : L'Opéra de quat'sous by Bertolt Brecht and Kurt Weill

Théâtre Nanterre-Amandiers
2013:  Macbeth by William Shakespeare

Opera productions
1989 : La Fille de madame Angot by Charles Lecocq - bicentenary of the French Revolution  
1997 : Orphée aux Enfers, by Jacques Offenbach, Lyon and Genève 
1999 : Platée, by Jean-Philippe Rameau, Opéra national de Paris (Palais Garnier)
2000 : La Belle Hélène, by Jacques Offenbach, Théâtre du Châtelet, Paris 
2001 : Les Sept Péchés capitaux, by Kurt Weill and Bertolt Brecht, Opéra national de Paris (Palais Garnier)
2002 : La Périchole, by Jacques Offenbach, Opéra de Marseille
2003, 2004 : Ariadne auf Naxos, by Richard Strauss, Opéra national de Paris
2003 : Les Contes d'Hoffmann, by Jacques Offenbach, Lausanne Opera 
2004 : La Grande-duchesse de Gérolstein, by Jacques Offenbach, Théâtre du Châtelet, Paris
2004 : Les Boréades, by Jean-Philippe Rameau, Opéra de Lyon
2004 : L'heure espagnole, by Maurice Ravel, Opéra national de Paris (Palais Garnier)
2004 : Gianni Schicchi, by Giacomo Puccini, Opéra national de Paris (Palais Garnier)
2006 : La belle Hélène, by Jacques Offenbach, English National Opera
2006 : Le Roi malgré lui, by Emmanuel Chabrier, Opéra de Lyon  
2006 : L'Amour des trois oranges, by Sergey Prokofiev, Dutch National Opera
2006 : Cendrillon, by Jules Massenet, Santa Fe Opera
2006, 2007 : L'élisir d'amore by Gaetano Donizetti, Opéra national de Paris (Bastille)
2007 : La fille du régiment, by Donizetti, Royal Opera House, Covent Garden, 
2007 : La vie parisienne, by Jacques Offenbach, Opéra de Lyon 
2007 : La fille du régiment, by Donizetti, Vienna State Opera
2007 : La finta semplice, by Mozart, Theater an der Wien
2007 : Le château de Barbe-Bleue, by Béla Bartók, Opéra de Lyon
2007 : Platée, by Rameau, Santa Fe Opera
2007 : Parlez-moi d'amour, Théâtre Royal de la Monnaie (staged songs with Felicity Lott)
2007 : La voix humaine, by Francis Poulenc and Jean Cocteau, Opéra de Lyon
2008 : Hänsel und Gretel, by Humperdinck, Glyndebourne Festival
2009 : Pelléas et Mélisande, by Claude Debussy Theater an der Wien
2009 : La traviata, by Giuseppe Verdi, Santa Fe Opera, 
2009 : Le Roi malgré lui, by Emmanuel Chabrier, Opéra-Comique, Paris
2009 : La vie parisienne, by Jacques Offenbach, TNT-Théâtre national de Toulouse Midi-Pyrénées
2010 : Manon, by Jules Massenet, Royal Opera House, Covent Garden 
2010 : Don Quichotte, by Jules Massenet, La Monnaie/de Munt 
2011 : Giulio Cesare, by Handel, Opéra national de Paris (Palais Garnier)
2011 : Cendrillon, by Jules Massenet, Royal Opera House, Covent Garden
2011 : Cendrillon, by Jules Massenet, La Monnaie/de Munt
2011 : L'elisir d'amore, by Donzietti, Maarinsky Theatre
2011 : La vie parisienne, by Jacques Offenbach, Opéra de Lyon
2012 : Cendrillon, by Jules Massenet, Opéra de Lille
2012 : La fille du régiment, by Donizetti, Opéra national de Paris (Bastille)
2012 : Manon, by Jules Massenet, Teatro alla scala, La Scala, Milan 
2012 : Manon, by Jules Massenet, Metropolitan Opera
2012 : L'enfant et les sortilèges/L'heure espagnol, by Ravel, Glyndebourne Festival
2012 : Robert le Diable, by Meyerbeer, Royal Opera House, Covent Garden
2013 : Les Contes d'Hoffmann, by Jacques Offenbach, Gran Teatre del Liceu, Barcelona 
2013 : Les contes d'Hoffmann, by Jacques Offenbach, Opéra de Lyon
2013 : Les contes d'hoffmann, by Jacques Offenbach, Teatro del Liceu, Barcelona
2013 : Cendrillon, by Jules Massenet, Teatro del Liceu, Barcelona 
2013 : I Puritani, by Bellini, Opéra national de Paris (Bastille)
2013 : La traviata, by Verdi, Teatro Massimo, Palermo
2013 : Les contes d'hoffmann, by Jacques Offenbach, San Francisco Opera
2014 : Le Comte Ory, by Rossini, Opéra de Lyon 
2014 : Le Comte Ory, by Rossini, Teatro alla Scala, Milan
2014 : Don Pasquale, by Donizetti, Santa Fe Opera 
2014 : L'Enfant et les Sortilèges / L'Heure espagnole, by Ravel, Saito Kinen Festival Matsumoto
2014 : L'Étoile, by Emmanuel Chabrier, Dutch National Opera 
2014 : La fille du régiment, by Donizetti, Teatro Real, Madrid
2014 : L'elisir d'amore, by Donizetti, Royal Opera House
2014 : Giulio Cesare, by Handel, Teatro Regio, Turin
2014 : La Grande-duchesse de Gérolstein, by Jacques Offenbach, Grand Théâtre de Genève
2015 : Hänsel & Gretel, by Humperdinck, Teatro Real, Madrid
2015 : Ariadne auf Naxos, by R. Strauss, Opéra national de Paris (Bastille)
2015 : Manon, by Jules Massenet, Metropolitan Opera, New York
2015 : Don Pasquale, by Donizetti, Teatro del Liceu, Barcelona
2015 : La traviata, by Verdi, Teatro Regio, Turin
2015 : L'enfant et les sortilèges/L'heure espagnol, by Ravel, Glyndebourne Festival
2015 : Platée, by Rameau, Opéra national de Paris (Palais Garnier)
2015 : L'elisir d'amore, by Donizetti, Opéra national de Paris (Bastille)
2105 : L'amour des Trois Oranges, by Projofiev, Theater Essen
2015 : Le Roi Carotte, by Jacques Offenbach, l'Opéra de Lyon
2016 : Le médecin malgré lui, By Gounod, Théâtre des nations, Geneva
2016 : L'enfant et les sortilèges/L'heure espagnol, by Ravel, Teatro alla Scala, Milan
2016 : Béatrice et Bénédict, by Hector Berlioz, Glyndebourne Festival
2016 : Don Pasquale, by Donizetti, San Francisco Opera
2016 : Hänsel & Gretel by Humperdinck, Seattle Opera
2016 : Le Coq d'or, by Rimski Korsakov, La Monnaie/de Munt
2017 : Le Coq d'Or, by Rimski Korsakov, Teatro Real, 
2017 : Le Coq d'Or, by Rimski Korsakov, Opéra national de Lorraine
2017 : Viva la mamma! by Donizetti, Opéra de Lyon
2017 : La fille du régiment, Teatro Maestranza, Seville
2017 : Il barbiere di Siviglia, by Rossini, Théâtre des Champs-Élysées
2018 : Le Roi carotte, by Jacques Offenbach, Opéra de Lille
2018 : Il barbiere di Siviglia, Opéra de Marseille
2018 : Il bariere di Siviglia, Grand Théâtre de Luxembourg
2018 : Cendrillon au Metropolitan Opera de New York
2018 : L'heure espagnol, by Ravel/Gianni Schicchi, by Puccini, Opéra national de Paris (Bastille)
2018 : Candide de Leonard Bernstein à L'Opéra de Santa Fé
2018 : Il barbiere di Siviglia, by Rossini, Edinburgh Festival
2018 : Lucia di Lammermoor, by Donizetti, Philadelphia Opera
2018 : L'elisir d'amore by Donizetti, Opéra Bastille, Paris
2018 : Les Contes d'hoffmann by Offenbach, Deutsche Oper Berlin
2018 : Cendrillon, by Jules Massenet, Chicago Lyric Opera
2018 : Don Pasquale, by Donizetti, La Monnaie/de Munt
2018 : Viva la mamma! by Donizetti, Grand Théâtre de Génève (Théâtre des Nations)
2019 : Lucia di Lammermoor, by Donizetti, Vienna State Opera
2019 : Il barbiere di Siviglia, Opéra national de Bordeaux
2019 : La Fille du Regiment, by Donizetti, Metropolitan Opera, New York
2019 : Falstaff, by Verdi, Teatro Real, Madrid
2019 : Barbe bleue, by Jacques Offenbach, Opéra de Lyon
2019 : La fille du régiment, Royal Opera House, Covent Garden

References

External links

Official webpage and biography

See also
List of opera directors

1962 births
Living people
Theatre directors from Paris
French opera directors